is a magical girl anime series by Studio Pierrot. It was simultaneously released as a manga by Kiyoko Arai. The third magical girl series created by Studio Pierrot, Magical Emi also appears in two feature-length OVAs, as well as the Adesugata Mahou no Sannin Musume and Majokko Club Yoningumi A-Kukan Kara no Alien X OVAs.

Plot
Mai Kazuki is from a family of magicians.  Her grandparents are leaders of a troupe, Magic Carat, and their daughter — Mai's mother — debuted under them.  Naturally, Mai wants to become a magician herself, just like her hero, the fabulous legend Emily Howell.  Unfortunately, because she is still a young girl, she is very clumsy and unsure.

One day, while helping her grandfather move things, Mai sees a strange light enter an odd, heart-shaped mirror and turn into a mirror fairy named Topo.  He takes over the body of her favorite stuffed toy, a flying squirrel doll, and explains that he must give magic to the one who can see him.  He gives her a bracelet with the symbols of the 4 card suits (spade, club, diamond and heart) which produces a magic wand.  By waving the wand, Mai becomes Magical Emi, a teenage magician.  She stars in her grandparents' shows, and uses magic to help solve problems.  But at the end of the day, she wants to become a magician all by herself.

Characters

Nakamori family
 Jouji Yanami as Yosuke Nakamori
 Mine Atsuko as Haruko Nakamori

Troupe Magic Carat
 Yū Mizushima as Sho Yuki
 Maya Okamoto as Yukiko Hirota
 Sukekiyo Kameyama as Akira Matsuo
 Kameyama Sukekiyo as Susumi Siozawa
 Naoki Tatsuta as Topo

Kazuki family
 Aoki Nana as Yoko Kazuki
 Rokuro Naya as Junichi Kazuki
 Yoko Obata as Mai Kazuki/Magical Emi
 Yūko Mita as Misaki Kazuki

Koganei family
 Shigeru Chiba as Madoka Kokubunji
 Daisuke Gouri as Shigeru Koganei
 Kazue Ikura as Musashi Koganei

Kazuki Junichi as Naya, Rokuro

Shinya Ohtaki as Akira

Music

Original songs
ByYoko Obata
  (OP)
 It also frequently appears in the play as a song sung by Emi and Hideaki Tokunaga.
  (ED)
 
It appears as Emi's new song from episode 32.

Anime
The 38-episode anime series, directed by Takashi Anno and produced by Studio Pierrot, aired from June 7, 1985 to February 28, 1986. The opening theme song is "Fushigi-Iro Happiness" and the ending theme song is "Anata Dake Dreaming", both by Yōko Obata.

References

External links 
 Magical Emi, the Magic Star
 Magical Emi, the Magic Star 
 

1985 anime television series debuts
1985 manga
1986 anime OVAs
1980s toys
Magical girl anime and manga
Nippon TV original programming
Pierrot (company)
Shōjo manga
Shogakukan manga